Andrés Leandro Castellanos Serrano (born March 9, 1984) is a  Colombian professional footballer who plays as a goalkeeper for Categoría Primera A club Santa Fe.

He spent five seasons with Cúcuta Deportivo and was part of Cúcuta 2006 Colombian 1st division Championship and helped Cúcuta to the semifinals of the Copa Libertadores.

Honours

Club 

Cúcuta
Champions Colombian Primera A: 2006

Santa Fe
Copa Sudamericana: 2015
Superliga Colombiana: 2013

External links
Career statistics

1984 births
Living people
Free University of Colombia alumni
Colombian footballers
Association football goalkeepers
Categoría Primera A players
Cúcuta Deportivo footballers
América de Cali footballers
Deportivo Cali footballers
Independiente Medellín footballers
Independiente Santa Fe footballers
People from Norte de Santander Department